Gaetano Gianola was an Italian-American mobster and former consigliere of the Detroit Partnership criminal organization.

During the early years of the Partnership, it was controlled by Gianola's brother, Anthony "Tony" Gianola with Gianola serving as consigliere and his younger brother, Salvatore, as the enforcer of the family. 

The brothers dominated Detroit's underworld until the early 1920s.

See also
"Gasper Sciblia" Milazzo
Angelo "Big Angelo" Meli
Vito William "Black Bill" Tocco
Giuseppe "Joey Z" Zerilli
Anthony Joseph "Tony Z" Zerilli
Giacamo William "Jack" Tocco

References

External links
AmericanMafia.com 26 Mafia Cities - Detroit, MI 
The Mob in America By Richard C. Lindberg

 

Year of birth missing
Year of death missing
Detroit Partnership
American gangsters of Italian descent
American bootleggers
American crime bosses